The Hudson–Hoosic Watershed is a drainage basin in the Northeastern United States.  It is located in the Vermont At Large Congressional District, Massachusetts 1st Congressional District, and New York 20th and 21st Congressional Districts.

References

External links
http://cfpub.epa.gov/surf/huc.cfm?huc_code=02020003

Watersheds of the United States